Angela Misri is a Kashmiri Canadian novelist and journalist and her fiction works include mystery, young adult fiction and children's fiction.

Early life and education 
Misri's family moved to Canada from London when she was 6. She received a master's degree from the University of Western Ontario and worked at the CBC while she was writing her first novel.

Career 
, Misri has published four novels that centre on detective Portia Adams: Jewel of the Thames (2014), Thrice Burned (2015), No Matter How Improbable (2016) and The Detective and the Spy (2020). Margaret Cannon praised The Detective and the Spy in her Globe and Mail column and the Canadian Broadcasting Corporation selected it as a recommended title for favourite Halloween books.

, Misri has published two novels in this series about animals in the zombie apocalypse: Pickles VS the Zombies (2019), and Trip of the Dead (2020). The third book in the series ValHamster is due out in the Spring of 2022. Pickles VS the Zombies was shortlisted for the 2020 Manitoba Young Reader's Choice Award and won the 2020 Hackmatack award for English Fiction.

Works

References

External links 
  
 DCB Author profile of Angela Misri

Living people
21st-century Canadian novelists
21st-century Canadian women writers
Canadian mystery writers
University of Western Ontario alumni
Year of birth missing (living people)
Canadian people of Kashmiri descent